Syllepte ochrotichroa is a moth in the family Crambidae. It is found in India (Assam).

References

Moths described in 1918
ochrotichroa
Moths of Asia